Marano sul Panaro is a comune (municipality) in the Province of Modena in the Italian region Emilia-Romagna, located about  west of Bologna and about  south of Modena.

Marano sul Panaro borders the following municipalities: Castelvetro di Modena, Guiglia, Maranello, Pavullo nel Frignano, Savignano sul Panaro, Serramazzoni, Vignola.

Twin towns
 Kofinas, Greece
 Montlouis-sur-Loire, France

References

Cities and towns in Emilia-Romagna